Cassia fikifiki is an uncommon small rainforest species of tree in the family Fabaceae.  It is found in Côte d'Ivoire and Liberia. It is a deciduous tree with a showy pendulous inflorescences of bright yellow flowers, and is easily confused in foliage with the common savanna tree Cassia sieberiana.

It is threatened by habitat loss and overharvesting as an aphrodisiac.  The bark has been investigated for antifilarial properties.

References

C.A.M. Marshall & W.D. Hawthrone, 2013. Important plants of northwestern Nimba County, Liberia: A guide to the most useful, rare or ecologically important species with Mano names and uses. Oxford Forestry Institute, Oxford, UK.

fikifiki
Endemic flora of Ivory Coast
Trees of Africa
Endangered flora of Africa
Taxonomy articles created by Polbot
Taxa named by François Pellegrin
Taxa named by André Aubréville